The term boot refers to a family of instruments of torture and interrogation variously designed to cause crushing injuries to the foot and/or leg. The boot has taken many forms in various places and times. Common varieties include the Spanish boot (sometimes referred to as "scarpines") and the Malay boot. One type was made of four pieces of narrow wooden board nailed together. The boards were measured to fit the victim's leg. Once the leg was enclosed, wedges would be hammered between the boards, creating pressure. The pressure would be increased until the victim confessed or lost consciousness. Newer variants have included iron vises—sometimes armed with spikes—that squeezed feet and metal frames employed red-hot. John Spreul is reported to have been tortured with two different boots.  In general, the boot was a mechanically-clever torture device and was widely employed throughout Europe to extract information.

Spanish boot
The Spanish boot was an iron casing for the leg and foot. Wood or iron wedges were hammered in between the casing and the victim's flesh. A similar device, commonly referred to as a shin crusher, squeezed the calf between two curved iron plates, studded with spikes, teeth, and knobs, to fracture the tibia and fibula.

Primitive forerunners of the archetype can be found dating back as far as a thousand years. The first Scottish effort, also referred to as a buskin, made use of a vaguely boot-shaped rawhide garment that was soaked with water, drawn over the foot and lower leg, and bound in place with cords. The contraption was slowly heated over a gentle fire, drastically contracting the rawhide and squeezing the foot until the bones were dislocated, though there would not have been sufficient pressure to actually crush the bones of the foot. A more progressive variant, found in both the British Isles and France, consisted of a trio of upright wooden boards that splinted around and between the feet, fundamentally identical to the Chinese foot torture known as Jiagun, and were tied in place by cords. Wedges were hammered between the boards and the feet to dislocate and crush the bones.  Even ancient India saw the use of the kittee, a simplistic wooden machine, resembling a lemon press, within which the bare foot was slowly squeezed.  A prototype hailing from Autun, France, consisted of high boots of spongy, porous leather that were drawn over the feet and legs. Boiling water was poured over the boots, eventually soaking through the leather and eating the flesh away from the entrapped limbs. Lastly, oversized boots of iron or copper (often soldered in place on the floor) received the prisoner's bare feet as he lay helplessly bound and gagged in a chair. The boots were slowly filled with boiling water or oil, or even molten lead, to consume the feet and legs. One variant—applied in Ireland to the martyr Dermot O'Hurley—consisted of lightweight metal boots that were filled with cool water and heated with the feet inside over a fire until the water boiled aggressively.

Malay boot

The Malay boot figures prominently in the film China Seas, in which the protagonist, portrayed by Clark Gable, is subjected to this cruel torture.  The instrument splints the foot and ankle between a pair of vertical boards made of strong wood or metal.  The members are vaguely boot shaped and completely enclose the prisoner's instep and toes.  A crank is turned to close the uprights around the foot, squeezing the entrapped foot to first grind the metatarsal heads together and eventually inflict sufficient pressure to shatter bones.  In the film, Clark Gable's character is tortured while wearing a sock; in actuality, the torture was applied to the bare foot.

Foot press
A similar implement, the foot press, consisted of a pair of horizontal iron plates slowly tightened around the bare foot by means of a crank mechanism, squeezing the foot with sufficient force to pulverize the bones. Although it was quite standard to line the lower plate with ribs to prevent the foot from popping out of the grip of the instrument as it became sweatier, a crueler variant of this device—typically encountered in Nuremberg, Germany—lined the upper plate with hundreds of sharp spikes. A version from Venice, sometimes called the foot screw or toe breaker, connected the crank mechanism to a drill that slowly mutilated the foot by boring a hole through the center of the instep as the press was tightened. The "toe breaker" from Nuremberg was a wider instrument that accommodated both feet, side by side, simultaneously applying inexorable crushing pressure to all ten toes.  Were the prisoner particularly stubborn or strong-willed, the press could be tightened until the plates met, so grinding the foot bones to powder.

Medieval boots were built according to a wide array of architectures. One commonly encountered boot consisted fundamentally of a pair of upright parallel boards that splinted the toes.  Turning the screw squeezed the toes between the boards, inflicting lateral pressure on the metatarsal heads and causing agony. Curling the toes over the edge of the boot—typically on pain of being blinded with a dagger—gave the device a stronger grip on the metatarsal heads, thereby enabling the application of maximum pressure and pain.  This is the type of boot commonly associated with the torture of Esmeralda in Victor Hugo's Hunchback of Notre-Dame.  Hollywood went out of its way to present exotic, even bizarre, boots that were short on historical accuracy, one of which was little more than dissociated spiked plates lying here and there. The cruelty of the torture could be increased by spacing the toes apart with stiff wooden pegs. Various extensions of the instrument were designed to crush the ankle, calf, or knee in addition to its primary target, the instep.  The toes often protruded from the front of the boot, facilitating the infliction of ancillary tortures, such as forcibly tearing the nails from the toes with red-hot pincers or exploring the delicate webbing between the toes with a red-hot iron probe.  This type of boot, also called the brodequin, seems to have been the commonest torture device in France.  An alternative "boot" of streamlined design, into which the bare foot was locked with an iron pin, squeezed the toes between iron bars until their bones were fractured.  A hinged variant cheaply manufactured from cast iron was used to torture slaves in colonial America.  Toe bones were also routinely crushed with mallets, sometimes by cruelly hammering sharp wooden wedges into the tips.

In The Big Book of Pain, Donnelly and Diehl present an ingenious and diabolical iron torture boot. The configurable device completely encloses the naked foot.  The roomy toe box is filled with iron spikes, teeth, and burs.  A vertical plate behind the prisoner's heel fits into a grooved track and can be forced forward by turning a wheel.  The steadily increasing pressure first forces the toes against the spikes, mangling their flesh and crushing their bones.  Under continued inexorable pressure, the bones of the instep eventually give way until the arch of the foot is shattered.  The heel bone is sufficiently powerful to withstand the torture, although the heel is not generously provided with afferent pain nociceptors.  Another variation occasionally seen (Scott, 1991) is a compartment beneath the sole of the prisoner's foot that can be filled with red-hot coals.

References in literature and the cinema

 In Victor Hugo's novel The Hunchback of Notre Dame, the character of Esmeralda is tortured using the boot. Through Hugo's sketchy description, we learn only the following: that the boot is "a heavy block of oak and ironwork" that completely encloses the naked foot; that the device is tightened by a screw; that the torture is so cruel that a single turn of the screw elicits bloodcurdling screams from the prisoner; and that foot-squeezing is such an effective torture that it is the first choice to force a murder confession. In fact, foot squeezing was the favorite torture in medieval and Enlightenment France.  In the 1939 movie version starring Charles Laughton with Maureen O'Hara as Esmeralda, the boot resembles dissociated planks with spikes scattered here and there; the device actually fitted over Esmeralda's foot is never seen. In the 1956 movie version starring Anthony Quinn and Gina Lollobrigida as Esmeralda, the boot is an ornate boot-shaped device of metal into which the front of Esmeralda's foot is inserted, squeezing her toes between the uprights and so grinding the metatarsal heads together until they are crushed. The boot was not shown in the Disney version.
 In Benjamin Christensen's 1922 Swedish film Häxan ("The Witch"), a boot-like torture is suggested by the juxtaposition of a generalized crusher—a rough stone that can be screwed down toward a metal base plate—to a woman's naked foot. In actuality, the device shown is a shin-crusher, not at all a torture device for the feet.
 In the film Shakespeare in Love, the protagonist is subjected to the foot-roasting torture. Due to Philip's character wearing boots in the scene, the torture was inaccurate.
 The Malay boot features in a scene from the 1935 film China Seas where it is applied to Clark Gable's stocking foot to force him to disclose the location of a ship's cargo of gold bullion. 
 In Mikhail Bulgakov's 1966 novel The Master and Margarita, Signora Tofana, a guest at Satan's Ball, arrives wearing a Spanish boot on her left leg.
 Ken Russell's The Devils shows the priest Urbain Grandier (Oliver Reed) being tortured with a form of the boot, in which large wedges are driven into his legs with a sledgehammer.
 The Spanish boot is used to extract confessions from those accused of witchcraft in the 1970 Czechoslovakian film Witches' Hunt (Kladivo na čarodějnice).
 In the 1987 Stephen King novel The Eyes of the Dragon, the castle's torture chamber is said to contain "racks and manacles and squeezing boots."
 Robert E. Howard's 1935/1936 Conan the Barbarian story The Hour of the Dragon refers to "racks, boots, hooks and all the implements that the human mind devises to tear flesh, break bones and rend and rupture veins and ligaments."
 In the first episode of the History Channel's program Surviving History, the Scarefactory design team builds and tests a re-creation of the boot, this one a classic, spike-lined Spanish boot or Beinschrauben (German for "leg-screw") that is tightened around a prisoner's calf by means of screws.
 In Charles Kingsley's Westward Ho! the character of Salvation Yeo is tortured by the Inquisition using 'scarpines' — though it is not clear what form of boot torture this is.  Even the typically prolix Oxford English Dictionary can offer only "an instrument of torture for the feet" for 'scarpines'.
In the 2015 horror film The Human Centipede 3 (Final Sequence), the main antagonist William 'Bill' Boss discusses "bringing back medieval torture" in response to the violence and unrest within his prison and suggests "Spanish boots" as one method.
 In Drago Jančar's Galiot the Spanish boot is illegally used to speed up the jurisdiction process.
 In episode 4 of the 1971 British television series The First Churchills, a prisoner receives the boot as torture in order to make him surrender the names of men accused of being Catholic.

References

Medieval instruments of torture
Modern instruments of torture
European instruments of torture